This list of cemeteries in San Diego includes currently operating, historical (closed for new interments), and defunct (graves abandoned or removed) cemeteries, columbaria, and mausolea in the county of San Diego, California. It does not include pet cemeteries. Selected interments are given for notable people.


 Mt. Olivet Cemetery, San Diego
 Cypress View Mausoleum
 Dearborn Memorial Park, Poway
 El Camino Memorial Park, San Diego
 El Cajon Cemetery, El Cajon
 Fort Rosecrans National Cemetery, Point Loma, San Diego
 Glen Abbey Memorial Park 
 Greenwood Memorial Park
 Haven of Rest, Julian
 Holy Cross Cemetery
 La Vista Memorial Park and Mortuary, National City
 Miramar National Cemetery
 Mission San Antonio de Pala Asistencia Cemetery, Pala Indian Reservation
 Mission Santa Ysabel Asistencia Cemetery, Santa Ysabel
 Mount Hope Cemetery, San Diego
 Oak Hill Memorial Park
 Oceanview Cemetery, Oceanside
 Old Mission San Luis Rey Cemetery, Oceanside
 San Marcos Cemetery,  Escondido
 San Pasqual Cemetery,  San Pasqual
 Singing Hills Memorial Park, El Cajon
 Valley Center Cemetery, Valley Center

See also
 List of cemeteries in California

References

Further reading

External links
 San Diego County cemeteries at Find a Grave
 VA benefits

Cemeteries
 

Geography of San Diego
San Diego
 
Cemeteries